The New Orleans Bee was an American broadsheet newspaper in New Orleans, Louisiana, founded on September 1, 1827, by François Delaup and originally located at 94 St. Peter Street, between Royal and Bourbon. The newspaper ceased publication on December 27, 1923.

Publication 
Initially published three times a week in French, an English-language section was added on November 24, 1827, and in this form it was the most successful of New Orleans daily newspapers in the middle of the nineteenth century. The English section was abandoned in 1872 because of increased competition from English-language newspapers but later restored. A Spanish-language section (Abeja) was published in 1829–1830.

Until at least 1897 L'Abeille remained "almost certainly the daily newspaper of choice" for French officials in New Orleans. The title was purchased in 1921 by The Times-Picayune and was published weekly until it closed in 1923. It was by some accounts the last French-language newspaper in New Orleans, ceasing publication on December 27, 1923, after ninety-six years; others assert that it was outlasted by Le Courrier de la Nouvelle Orleans, which continued until 1955.

See also

 List of newspapers in Louisiana
 Literature of Louisiana
List of French-language newspapers published in the United States

References

External links

 Archives of The New Orleans Bee - Jefferson Parish Library

Publications established in 1827
Publications disestablished in 1925
Newspapers published in New Orleans
French-American culture in Louisiana
French-language newspapers published in the United States
Bilingual newspapers
Non-English-language newspapers published in Louisiana
Defunct newspapers published in Louisiana
1827 establishments in Louisiana
1925 disestablishments in Louisiana